River is a 2015 drama film directed Sonthar Gyal. The film was shown to a great fanfare during 19th Shanghai International Film Festival in China.

References

External links
 

2015 films
Films about Tibet
Tibetan-language films
Films directed by Sonthar Gyal